Firuraq Rural District is in the Central District of Khoy County, West Azerbaijan province, Iran. At the National Census of 2006, its population was 13,116 in 2,590 households. There were 13,708 inhabitants in 3,695 households at the following census of 2011. At the most recent census of 2016, the population of the rural district was 14,219 in 4,059 households. The largest of its 26 villages was Var, with 4,808 people.

References 

Khoy County

Rural Districts of West Azerbaijan Province

Populated places in West Azerbaijan Province

Populated places in Khoy County